Hamas is a Palestinian Islamic organisation. Hamas may also refer to:

Hamas of Iraq, a Sunni militia group in Iraq
Movement of Society for Peace, a political party in Algeria formerly known as Hamas
 Hamas (horse)
Steve Hamas (1907–1974), American football player and boxer